Kamla, meaning "to cut on rock" in Kwak'wala, is a village of the Kwakwaka'wakw peoples, located on the southeast side of Gilford Island on Tribune Channel.  The village site is on Kumlah Island, and was a camp of the Dlidligit and Kwicksutaineuk.  It is under the administration of the Kwikwasut'inuxw Haxwa'mis First Nation, as Kyimla Indian Reserve No. 11.

See also
List of Kwakwaka'wakw villages

References

Kwakwaka'wakw villages
Central Coast of British Columbia